The 2019 Big Ten conference football season was the 124th season of college football play for the Big Ten Conference and was part of the 2019 NCAA Division I FBS football season.

This was the Big Ten's sixth season with 14 teams. The defending league champion was Ohio State. The 2019 season consisted of a nine-game conference schedule for the fourth year in a row.

The Big Ten had two new coaches for the 2019 season. Ohio State promoted offensive coordinator Ryan Day to head coach, replacing Urban Meyer who retired at the end of the 2018 season. Maryland also had a new coach for 2019, hiring Mike Locksley to replace D. J. Durkin, who was fired in 2018 ultimately due to the events that led to the death of player Jordan McNair.

The first coaching change during the 2019 season came on September 29, 2019 when Rutgers dismissed Chris Ash. Tight ends coach Nunzio Campanile served as interim coach for the remainder of the 2019 season. Then on December 1, Rutgers announced that former coach Greg Schiano would return to coach the team in 2020.

On the field of play, Ohio State won the East Division title and made their fifth appearance in the Big Ten Football Championship Game and third consecutive appearance. In the West Division, Wisconsin and Minnesota tied for the division title, but the Badgers represented the division in the conference title game due to their head-to-head win over the Golden Gophers. Wisconsin made their sixth appearance in the conference title game overall. In that championship game, Ohio State defeated Wisconsin 34-21 to win their third consecutive Big Ten championship. With that win, the Buckeyes landed a spot in the 2019-20 College Football Playoff as the #2 seed.

Previous season
Ohio State defeated Northwestern, 45–24, in the Big Ten Football Championship Game. The win gave the Buckeyes their second consecutive Big Ten championship.

Nine teams participated in bowl games in the 2018 season and the league 5–4 in those games, however the Big Ten failed to land a team in the College Football Playoff for the second straight year.

Minnesota defeated Georgia Tech, 34–10 in the Quick Lane Bowl. Wisconsin defeated Miami (FL), 35–3, in the Pinstripe Bowl. Purdue lost to Auburn, 63–14, in the Music City Bowl. Michigan State lost to Oregon, 7–6, in the Redbox Bowl. Northwestern defeated No. 20 Utah, 31–20, in the Holiday Bowl. Iowa defeated No. 18 Mississippi State, 27–22, in the Outback Bowl. No. 13 Penn State lost to No. 16 Kentucky, 27–24, in the Citrus Bowl.

In the New Year's Six Games, No. 8 Michigan lost to No. 10 Florida, 41–15, in the Peach Bowl. And No. 5 Ohio State defeated No. 9 Washington, 28–23, in the Rose Bowl.

Preseason
2019 Big Ten Spring Football and number of signees on signing day:

Recruiting classes

Big Ten Media Days
The Big Ten conducted its annual media days at the Chicago Marriott Downtown Chicago Magnificent Mile in Chicago, IL on July 23–24. The event commenced with a speech by Big Ten commissioner Jim Delany, and all 14 teams sent their head coaches and two selected players to speak with members of the media. The event along with all speakers and interviews were broadcast live on the Big Ten Network. The teams and representatives in respective order were as follows:

Preseason media polls
The Big Ten Media Days concluded with its annual preseason media polls in early August. Since 1992, the credentialed media has gotten the preseason champion correct just five times. Only eight times has the preseason pick even made it to the Big Ten title game. Below are the results of the media poll with total points received next to each school and first-place votes in parentheses. For the 2019 poll, Michigan was voted as the favorite to win both the East Division and the Big Ten Championship Game.

Preseason awards

Preseason All-Big Ten

East Division
Joe Bachie, Sr., LB, Michigan State
Kenny Willekes, Sr., DE, Michigan State
J. K. Dobbins, Jr., RB, Ohio State
Chase Young, Jr., DE, Ohio State
Yetur Gross-Matos, Jr., DE, Penn State

West Division
A. J. Epenesa, Jr., DE, Iowa
Adrian Martinez, So., QB, Nebraska 
Paddy Fisher, Jr., LB, Northwestern 
Rondale Moore, So., WR, Purdue
Jonathan Taylor, Jr., RB, Wisconsin

Rankings

Schedule

All times Eastern time.

† denotes Homecoming game

Regular season
The Regular season will begin on August 29 and will end on November 30.

Week #1

Week #2

Week #3

Week #4

Week #5

Week #6

Week #7

Week #8

Week #9

Week #10

Week #11

Week #12

Week #13

Week #14

Week #15 (Big Ten Championship Game)

Postseason

Bowl games

Rankings are from CFP rankings.  All times Eastern Time Zone.  Big Ten teams shown in bold.

Big Ten records vs Other Conferences
2019–2020 records against non-conference foes:

Regular Season

Post Season

Awards and honors

Player of the week honors

Big Ten Individual Awards

The following individuals won the conference's annual player and coach awards:

All-Conference Teams

2019 Big Ten All-Conference Teams and Awards

Coaches Honorable Mention: ILLINOIS: Kendrick Green, Jake Hansen, Doug Kramer; INDIANA: Peyton Hendershot, Caleb Jones, Micah McFadden, Tiawan Mullen, Simon Stepaniak, Haydon Whitehead; IOWA: Chauncey Golston, Cedrick Lattimore, Tyler Linderbaum, Ihmir Smith-Marsette, Nate Stanley, Kristian Welch; MARYLAND: Nick Cross, Dontay Demus Jr., Ayinde Eley, Keandre Jones, Javon Leake; MICHIGAN: Zach Charbonnet, Nico Collins, Nick Eubanks, Hassan Haskins, Aidan Hutchinson, Giles Jackson, Jalen Mayfield, Cameron McGrone, Sean McKeon, Josh Metellus, Donovan Peoples-Jones; MICHIGAN STATE: Joe Bachie, Elijah Collins, Jake Hartbarger, Mike Panasiuk, Josiah Scott, Antjuan Simmons, Cody White; MINNESOTA: Curtis Dunlap Jr., Coney Durr, Daniel Faalele, Kamal Martin, Conner Olson, Sam Renner, Sam Schlueter; NEBRASKA: Darrion Daniels, Brenden Jaimes, Dedrick Mills, JD Spielman; NORTHWESTERN: Blake Gallagher, Rashawn Slater, Travis Whillock; OHIO STATE: Tuf Borland, Baron Browning, Drue Chrisman, Jashon Cornell, K. J. Hill, Robert Landers, Pete Werner; PENN STATE: Tariq Castro-Fields, Sean Clifford, Will Fries, Blake Gillikin, K. J. Hamler, Jan Johnson, Michal Menet, Jake Pinegar, John Reid, Garrett Taylor, Lamont Wade; PURDUE: Derrick Barnes, J.D. Dellinger, Ben Holt, George Karlaftis, Matt McCann; RUTGERS: Tyshon Fogg; WISCONSIN: Logan Bruss, Eric Burrell, Quintez Cephus, Jake Ferguson, Matt Henningsen, Faion Hicks, Isaiahh Loudermilk, Cole Van Lanen.

Media Honorable Mention: ILLINOIS: Dre Brown, Sydney Brown, Kendrick Green, Stanley Green Jr., Jake Hansen, Nate Hobbs, Josh Imatorbhebhe, Doug Kramer, Jamal Milan, Alex Palczewski; INDIANA: Demarcus Elliott, Tiawan Mullen, Peyton Ramsey; IOWA: Chauncey Golston, Michael Sleep-Dalton, Tyler Linderbaum, Ihmir Smith-Marsette, Geno Stone, Kristian Welch; MARYLAND: Keandre Jones, Javon Leake, Ellis McKennie; MICHIGAN: Ronnie Bell, Nico Collins, Nick Eubanks, Jordan Glasgow, Hassan Haskins, Brad Hawkins, Giles Jackson, Cameron McGrone, Sean McKeon, Michael Onwenu, Donovan Peoples-Jones, Ambry Thomas; MICHIGAN STATE: Matt Coghlin, David Dowell, Jake Hartbarger, Mike Panasiuk, Antjuan Simmons, Cody White; MINNESOTA: Thomas Barber, Curtis Dunlap Jr., Coney Durr, Daniel Faalele, Kamal Martin, Conner Olson, Sam Renner, Sam Schlueter, Benjamin St-Juste; NEBRASKA: Mohammed Barry, Dicaprio Bootle, Khalil Davis, Brenden Jaimes, Dedrick Mills, Wan'Dale Robinson, JD Spielman, Cam Taylor-Britt; NORTHWESTERN: Blake Gallagher, Rashawn Slater, Jared Thomas; OHIO STATE: Tuf Borland, Baron Browning, Drue Chrisman, Jashon Cornell, Luke Farrell, K. J. Hill, Robert Landers, Pete Werner; PENN STATE: Cam Brown, Journey Brown, Sean Clifford, Will Fries, Blake Gillikin, K. J. Hamler, Jan Johnson, Michal Menet, Jake Pinegar, John Reid, Shaka Toney, Garrett Taylor, Lamont Wade, Robert Windsor; PURDUE: J.D. Dellinger, Ben Holt, Matt McCann, Cory Trice; RUTGERS: Tyshon Fogg, Willington Previlon; WISCONSIN: Logan Bruss, Eric Burrell, Quintez Cephus, Jack Coan, Jake Ferguson, Faion Hicks, Isaiahh Loudermilk, Rachad Wildgoose.

All-Americans

The 2019 College Football All-America Team is composed of the following College Football All-American first teams chosen by the following selector organizations: Associated Press (AP), Football Writers Association of America (FWAA), American Football Coaches Association (AFCA), Walter Camp Foundation (WCFF), The Sporting News (TSN), Sports Illustrated (SI), USA Today (USAT) ESPN, CBS Sports (CBS), FOX Sports (FOX) College Football News (CFN), Bleacher Report (BR), Scout.com, Phil Steele (PS), SB Nation (SB), Athlon Sports, Pro Football Focus (PFF), The Athletic, and Yahoo! Sports (Yahoo!).

Currently, the NCAA compiles consensus all-America teams in the sports of Division I-FBS football and Division I men's basketball using a point system computed from All-America teams named by coaches associations or media sources.  The system consists of three points for a first-team honor, two points for second-team honor, and one point for third-team honor.  Honorable mention and fourth team or lower recognitions are not accorded any points.  Football consensus teams are compiled by position and the player accumulating the most points at each position is named first team consensus all-American.  Currently, the NCAA recognizes All-Americans selected by the AP, AFCA, FWAA, TSN, and the WCFF to determine Consensus and Unanimous All-Americans. Any player named to the First Team by all five of the NCAA-recognized selectors is deemed a Unanimous All-American.

*Associated Press All-America Team (AP)
*Sports Illustrated All-America Team (SI)
*CBS Sports All-America Team (CBS)
*USA Today All-America Team (USAT)
*The Athletic All-America Team (Athletic)
*Walter Camp Football Foundation All-America Team (WCFF)
*ESPN All-America Team (ESPN)
*The Sporting News All-America Team (TSN)
*AFCA All-America Team (AFCA)
*FWAA All-America Team (FWAA)
*Athlon Sports All-America Team (Athlon)
*Phil Steele All-America Team (Phil Steele)

All–Academic

National Award Winners

2019 College Football Award Winners

Doak Walker Award (Best Running Back)
Jonathan Taylor, Wisconsin

Chuck Bednarik Award (Best Defensive Player)
Chase Young, Ohio State

Nagurski Award (Best Defensive Player)
Chase Young, Ohio State

Rimington Trophy (Best Center)
Tyler Biadasz, Wisconsin

Burlsworth Trophy (Best Former Walk-On)
Kenny Willekes, Michigan State

Disney Spirit Award (Most Inspirational Player)
Casey O'Brien, Minnesota

Home Attendance

Bold – Exceed capacity
†Season High
‡Played at Soldier Field

2020 NFL Draft

The Big Ten had 48 players selected in the 2020 NFL Draft, which was second among all FBS conferences, trailing only the SEC who had 63 picks.

Draft Notes

Head coaches

Current through the completion of the 2019-20 season

* Tom Allen was hired to replace Kevin Wilson in December 2016 at Indiana and coached the Hoosiers in their 2016 bowl game, going 0–1.

* Mike Locksley served as interim head coach at Maryland in 2015 and coached for six games, going 1–5.

* Ryan Day served as interim head coach at Ohio State for the first three games of the 2018 season while Urban Meyer served a three-game suspension and went 3–0.

* Chris Ash was terminated as head coach at Rutgers on Sept. 29, 2019. Tight ends coach Nunzio Campanile was named interim coach for the remainder of the 2019 season.

References